Electrolux AB is a Swedish multinational home appliance manufacturer, headquartered in Stockholm. It is consistently ranked the world's second largest appliance maker by units sold, after Whirlpool.

Electrolux products sell under a variety of brand names (including its own), and are primarily major appliances and vacuum cleaners intended for home consumer use. Electrolux has a primary listing on the Stockholm Stock Exchange and is a constituent of the OMX Stockholm 30 index.

History

The company originates from a merger of two companies—Lux AB and Svenska Elektron AB, the former an established manufacturer and the latter a younger company founded by a former vacuum salesman who had also been an employee of the former firm. The origins of Electrolux are closely tied to the vacuum, but today it also makes major appliances.

Electrolux made an initial public offering on the London Stock Exchange in 1928 (it was delisted in 2010) and another on the Stockholm Stock Exchange in 1930.

 its shares trade on the NASDAQ OMX Nordic Market and over-the-counter. Electrolux is an OMX Nordic 40 constituent stock.

Sales company to major manufacturer
In 1919, a Svenska Elektron AB acquisition, Elektromekaniska AB, became Elektrolux (the spelling was changed to Electrolux in 1957). It initially sold Lux branded vacuum cleaners in several European countries.

In 1923, the company acquired AB Arctic and subsequently added absorption refrigerators to its product line. Other appliances soon followed, including washing machines in 1951, dishwashers in 1959, and food service equipment in 1962.

Mergers and acquisitions
The company has often and regularly expanded through mergers and acquisitions.

While Electrolux had bought several companies before the 1960s, that decade saw the beginnings of a new wave of M&A activity. The company bought ElektroHelios, Norwegian Elektra, Danish Atlas, Finnish Slev, and Flymo, et al., in the nine years from 1960 to 1969. It sold its American subsidiary to Consolidated Foods in 1968, exiting the American market until 1974, when Electrolux acquired Eureka-Williams from National Union, one of the oldest names in the vacuum cleaner industry. Electrolux sold its vacuum cleaners using the Eureka brand name in North America until 2004.

This style of growth continued through the 1990s, seeing Electrolux purchase scores of companies including, for a time, Husqvarna.  

Hans Werthen, President and later chairman of the board, led the strategic core of an increasingly decentralized Electrolux—and was instrumental to its rapid growth.

While attempts to cut costs, centralise administration, and wring out economies of scale from Electrolux's operations were made in the 1960s and 1970s with the focus so firmly on growth, further company-wide restructuring efforts only began in the late 1990s.

2000 to present
In North America, the Electrolux name was long used by vacuum cleaner manufacturer Aerus LLC, originally established to sell Swedish Electrolux products. In 2000, Aerus transferred trademark rights back to the Electrolux Group, and ceased using the Electrolux name in 2004.

Conversely, Electrolux-made vacuums carried the Eureka brand name, which Electrolux continued to use while also selling Electrolux branded vacuums after 2000. Electrolux USA customer service maintains a database of Electrolux made vacuums and provides a link to Aerus's website for the convenience of owners of Electrolux branded Aerus vacuums.

Keith McLoughlin took over as president and CEO on January 1, 2011, and became the company's first non Swedish chief executive.

In August 2011, Electrolux acquired from Sigdo Koppers the Chilean appliance manufacturer CTI obtaining several brands with the purchase including: Fensa, Gafa, Mademsa and Somela.

On February 6, 2017, Electrolux announced that it had agreed to acquire Anova Applied Electronics, Inc., the U.S.-based provider of the Anova Precision Cooker.

On March 23, 2020, Electrolux completed the spin-off of its professional division, which the separated company incorporated as Electrolux Professional AB.

Notable products

 1919: The Lux vacuum is the first product Electrolux sells.
 1925: D, Electrolux's first refrigerator, is an absorption model.
 1937: Electrolux model 30 vacuum is unveiled.  
 1940: Assistent (Swedish for assistant), the company's only wartime consumer product, is a mixer/food processor.
  1941: Charlton Automatic rifle Electrolux SMLE Model Lee–Enfield A replacement of the bren gun for the home guard soldiers, made from out-of-service Lee-Enfields. New Zealander Philip Charlton, a car mechanic, designed the gun in Australia. Only 2 were ever made.
 1951: W 20, Electrolux's first home washing machine, is manufactured in Gothenburg, Sweden.
 1959: D 10, the company's first dishwasher, is a counter top model nicknamed "round jar".
 2001: Launch of the Electrolux Trilobite, a robotic vacuum cleaner.

Brands

Electrolux sells under a wide variety of brand names worldwide. Most of them were acquired through mergers and acquisitions and only do business in a single country or geographic area. The following is an incomplete list.

Americas 
 Anova Applied Electronics, Inc., provider of the Anova Precision Cooker
 Electrolux ICON, premium consumer appliance brand sold in the US
 Eureka, American consumer vacuum cleaner brand, Sold to Midea, China in 2016
 Fensa, Chilean consumer appliance brand, widely available in Latin America.
 Frigidaire, major appliance manufacturer.
 Gafa, Argentinean appliance manufacturer.
 Gibson, refrigerator and air conditioning manufacturer
 Mademsa, Chilean home appliance brand
 Philco, former U.S. consumer electronics and appliance manufacturer for appliances, though brand name is also used separately for electronics by Philips
 Sanitaire, commercial product division of Eureka
 Somela, Chilean home appliance brand, available throughout Latin America
 Tappan, former U.S. appliance manufacturer
 White-Westinghouse, former U.S. appliance manufacturer

Europe 
 Arthur Martin
 AEG
 Atlas (Denmark)
 Corberó (Spain)
 Dometic, appliances for recreational camper and caravan vehicles, also uses the Electrolux logo. Based in Sweden and owned by Dometic Group
 Elektro Helios, manufacturer of consumer appliances for the Swedish market
 Faure, French consumer appliance maker
 Lehel, consumer appliance brand sold in Hungary and elsewhere
 Marynen/Marijnen, consumer product brand sold in the Netherlands
 Parkinson Cowan, cooking appliances (United Kingdom)
 Progress, vacuum cleaner brand sold throughout Europe
 REX-Electrolux, Italian appliance manufacturer
 Rosenlew, Finnish consumer product brand sold in Nordic countries
 Samus, Romanian producer of cooking stoves headquartered in Satu Mare 
 Voss, premium consumer cooking appliance and equipment supplier in Denmark and elsewhere
 Zanker, consumer kitchen appliance brand sold in central Europe
 Zanussi, Italian appliance manufacturer that became part of Electrolux in 1984 
 Zanussi Professional, professional kitchen equipment manufacturer
 Zoppas, consumer products brand sold in Italy

Oceania 
 Dishlex, a dishwasher brand sold in Australia (discontinued in August 2021)
 Kelvinator, an air conditioning and fridge freezer brand sold in Australia, India and elsewhere
 Simpson, previously sold Kitchen and laundry appliances, now they only sell laundry appliances. They are a brand sold in Australia and New Zealand. (discontinued in July 2022) 
 Westinghouse, a kitchen and laundry appliance brand in Australia licensed from Westinghouse Electric Corp to Electrolux Home Products Pty Ltd.

Middle East 
 King, Israeli kitchen appliance brand made by REX-Electrolux, an Italian Electrolux subsidiary.
 Olympic Group, home appliance brand in Egypt

Global/other 
 Arthur Martin-Electrolux
 Beam, Electrolux's central vacuum brand
 Castor
 Chef
 Dito, professional food processing equipment
 Electrolux Laundry Systems
 Electrolux Professional
 Frigidaire, full range major appliance brand sold globally
 Juno-Electrolux, premium consumer kitchen appliance brand
 Molteni, professional stoves
 Tornado, vacuum cleaners and other consumer products
 Therma
 Tricity Bendix
 Volta, vacuum cleaner brand sold in Australia, Sweden and elsewhere
 Wascator, now under Electrolux Laundry Systems

Note: This list does not include brands such as Kenmore, IKEA and John Lewis, which may sell Electrolux produced appliances but are not owned by or affiliated with Electrolux, as Electrolux acts as an OEM for these brands.

Slogan
The company's international slogan is "Shape living for the better". In the past it was "Thinking of you". 

In the 1960s the company successfully marketed vacuums in the United Kingdom with the slogan "Nothing sucks like an Electrolux".
In the United States, it was frequently assumed that using this slogan was a brand blunder. In fact, the informal American meaning of the word sucks was already well known at the time in the United Kingdom, and the company hoped the slogan, with its possible double entendre, would gain attention. 

In Indonesia, the Electrolux previous slogan was "Kalau saja semua seawet Electrolux" (English: If only all durable as Electrolux).

See also

Constructor Group AS, a former Electrolux subsidiary not involved in major appliance manufacture

References

External links

Official group website
Official group website North Macedonia
American Electrolux - The Beginning, and the Early Years by Charles Richard Lester
Macedonia Electrolux - The Beginning, and the Early Years by Dimche Palenzo Electrolux

 
Home appliance brands
Home appliance manufacturers of Sweden
Vacuum cleaner manufacturers
Swedish brands
Electronics companies established in 1919
Swedish companies established in 1919
Multinational companies headquartered in Sweden
Companies related to the Wallenberg family
1920s initial public offerings
Companies listed on Nasdaq Stockholm
Companies formerly listed on the London Stock Exchange
Manufacturing companies established in 1919